Rigoberta Bandini is a Spanish musical act as well as the stage name of its frontwoman, singer-songwriter Paula Ribó. Other members of the band are Ribó's partner, Esteban Navarro, and cousins, Joan Barenys and Belén Barenys (Memé), who variously provide instrumentation and vocals. Ribó and Memé sing; Barenys is a multi-instrumentalist; and Navarro plays keyboard and produces with Ribó. The act has been nominated for two Premios Odeón, winning one, among other accolades.

History 
In 2019, Paula Ribó, who had been a member of the Mamzelles in the 2010s and dubbed many musicals into Spanish and Catalan, launched her solo music career under the stage name of Rigoberta Bandini. The name combines those of human rights activist Rigoberta Menchú and the John Fante character Arturo Bandini.

Ribó began releasing music as Rigoberta Bandini in 2020, which she, Navarro, and the Barenys siblings had recorded. That year, Rigoberta Bandini (still principally identified as Ribó as a solo act) rose to prominence in Spain when the singles "Too Many Drugs" and "In Spain We Call It Soledad" went viral. The group began performing together in 2021. The first live performance as a group was a selection of their songs recorded for a live-at-home concert from the Thyssen Museum in December 2020, after which they began touring. They found further success with the song "Ay mamá", with which they competed in the inaugural Benidorm Fest.

Style 
The music of Rigoberta Bandini draws on many feminist influences, heard overtly in "Perra" and "Ay mamá". Ribó has said that, in her songwriting, she enjoys lyrics that have humour and entertain her.

Clash described a live set by the group as "high-energy chaos", noting that the music drew on genres including flamenco, synth-pop, and rap. Eurovision Song Contest music website Wiwibloggs described the group's musical style as a fusion of harmonic choral elements and electropop. Hot Press compared the group's sound to Pet Shop Boys, Peaches, Celine Dion and Pussy Riot.

In terms of live performance, Clash noted that the music is elevated by the energy of the group. It praised their ability to all be dancing energetically and at the same time "maintain their ABBA-like harmonies". At concerts, Ribó characteristically wears her old school uniform from the Col·legi de les Teresianes, with Memé in a similar outfit and Navarro and Barenys dressed as "computer nerd cool". Time Out Barcelona described the Rigoberta Bandini performance at Primavera Sound 2022 as a variety show or a party, as space was given for Navarro to add some stand-up comedy and for Memé to take more of a spotlight.

Personnel 

 Paula Ribó González – An actress and singer, Ribó is the frontwoman of the group who is also individually known as Rigoberta Bandini. She is the lead vocalist and writes, composes, and produces the songs.
 Belén Barenys González (also known by the stage name Memé) – Also an actress and singer, and Ribó's cousin, Memé has previously worked with Ribó in dubbing, including voicing the young Merida across from Ribó as the main version in the Catalan version of Brave. She provides background vocals, and occasionally lead vocals alongside Ribó.
 Joan Barenys González – An actor and musician, Memé's brother and Ribó's cousin, he has dubbed films with both women, including the Catalan version of Up with Memé and the Castilian version of Hotel for Dogs with Ribó. He is a multi-instrumentalist; originally a pianist, in Rigoberta Bandini performances Navarro takes the keys and Barenys provides percussion and guitar.

Discography

Studio albums

Singles

As featured artist 
 "Se va" (2021) (with Delaporte)
 "Amanecer" (2021) (with Alizzz)

Promotional singles 
 "Fiesta" (2020)
 "Cuando tú nazcas" (2020)

Awards and nominations

References

2021 establishments in Catalonia
2021 establishments in Spain
Musical groups established in 2021
Musical groups from Catalonia
Spanish dance music groups
Spanish electronic music groups
Spanish Eurodance groups
Spanish pop music groups
Female-fronted musical groups
Alternative dance musical groups
Dance-pop groups
Electropop groups
Indie pop groups
Latin pop music groups
Synthpop groups
Benidorm Fest contestants